RailGiants Train Museum is a railroad museum of historic trains located at the Fairplex in Pomona, California, United States.

The museum was closed indefinitely in March 2020 as a result of the COVID-19 pandemic, but after renovations, it reopened in May 2022.

Collection
The collection features historic locomotives which visitors may board. The museum also features a historic train station, a library, and a collection of railway memorabilia. Currently, entry to the museum is free and open to the public on the second weekend of each month.

A notable locomotive in the collection is the Union Pacific 4014, which was on display at the museum until 2014, when it was moved for restoration.

The museum was featured in Visiting... with Huell Howser along with Kidsongs Boppin with the Biggles songs, Little red caboose & The Locomotion  Episode 1015.

Displayed Locomotives

See also

List of railway museums

References

External links

Buildings and structures in Pomona, California
Culture of Pomona, California
Museums in Los Angeles County, California
Railroad museums in California